Johnny Garton (born 26 March 1987) is an English former professional boxer from 2011 to 2019. who held the British welterweight title from 2018 to 2019.

Early life
Garton grew up on the Clifton housing estate in Peckham, London, living with his mother and sister in one of the estate's tower blocks. He attended Peckham Park Primary School and then Hatcham Wood secondary school in Brockley. After leaving school he attended college to study car mechanics. Garton first started boxing at age 18 when he went along with a friend to Lynn AC boxing club in Camberwell, London.

Professional career 

Garton made his professional debut on 20 October 2011, scoring a four-round points decision (PTS) victory over Danny Donchev at the York Hall in London.

After remaining unbeaten in 11 fights, he took part in the 34th instalment of the Prizefighter series on 5 April 2014 at the York Hall. Garton faced off against Sam Eggington in the quarterfinal, losing via second-round technical knockout (TKO).

On 13 December 2014, he fought Adam Battle at the York Hall for the vacant Southern Area welterweight title, winning by TKO in round eight. He successfully defended the title twice, firstly against Nathan Weise with a fifth-round TKO on 14 March 2015 and against Martin Welsh on 16 May, retaining his title through a points draw.

Following a sixth-round TKO win in a rematch with Welsh in September and a PTS win over Casey Blair in December, Garton faced Ryan Fields for the vacant English welterweight title on 7 May 2016 at the York Hall. Garton won the fight along with the English title with a fourth-round TKO. He defended the title on 17 September 2016 against Tyler Goodjohn, scoring a ten round unanimous decision (UD) victory. Two judges scored the bout 99–91 while the third scored it 98–92.

After a PTS victory against Geiboord Omier in November 2016 and a sixth-round TKO win over Ivica Gogosevic in April 2017, he went on to defeat Mihail Orlov by tenth-round TKO on 9 December 2017 at the Copper Box Arena in London to capture the vacant IBF European welterweight title.

After defeating Nelson Altamirano in his next outing by second-round knockout (KO) in a stay-busy fight on 23 June 2018, Garton faced former world title challenger Gary Corcoran for the vacant British welterweight title on 20 October, at the Brentwood Centre in Essex. In a bloody fight, which saw Garton suffer a deep cut on the forehead resulting from a clash of heads in the round six, Garton captured the vacant British title via eleventh-round TKO after referee Steve Gray deemed Corcoran unfit to continue following a barrage of unanswered punches. The first defence of his British title came on 8 March 2019 against Chris Jenkins at the Royal Albert Hall in London. Garton lost the title by unanimous decision with the judge's scorecards reading 119–109, 117–112 and 116–112.

Professional boxing record

References

External links

Living people
1987 births
People from Peckham
Boxers from Greater London
English male boxers
Welterweight boxers
British Boxing Board of Control champions
England Boxing champions